Dubovy is a rural locality (a khutor) in Pologozaymishchensky Selsoviet of Akhtubinsky District, Astrakhan Oblast, Russia. The population was 11 as of 2010. There is 1 street.

Geography 
Dubovy is located 38 km northwest of Akhtubinsk (the district's administrative centre) by road. Rogozin is the nearest rural locality.

References 

Rural localities in Akhtubinsky District